Emmy Sofia Oline Karemyr (born 1 February 1994) is a Swedish actress. She is best known for her roles in the films Call Girl and Becoming Astrid, and the Viaplay series Älska mig and Partisan.

Early and personal life
Karemyr is from Stockholm. She attended Östra Real in Östermalm for high school and took acting classes at Calle Flygare Teaterskola in Norrmalm.

As of 2020, Karemyr is based in Södermalm with her boyfriend Martin Rehnström.

Filmography

Film

Television

References

External links

Living people
1994 births
21st-century Swedish actresses
Actresses from Stockholm